The Kalmare ledung (Swedish for "sea-borne expedition to Kalmar") was a crusade led by the Norwegian king Sigurd the Crusader performed in 1123 to Christianize the region of Småland (before the consolidation of Sweden was completed). The crusade can be dated relatively accurately with information from Snorri Sturluson stating that the crusade must have taken place in the summer before the "great darkness". On 11 August 1124, a solar eclipse occurred, which means that the crusade most likely took place during the period June–August 1123.

While the rest of Sweden had become at least Christian by appearance by the 1080s, the province of Småland had experienced very little contact with Christianity and remained openly pagan in the 1120s, with the inhabitants still openly worshiping the Norse gods. Sigurd the Crusader made a pact with king Niels of Denmark to perform a crusade against Småland and force Christianity upon the pagans. There is no mention of a (Christian) Swedish king, even though the crusade took place against a nominally Swedish province, and the Danish king was married to a Swedish princess, Margaret Fredkulla. The Danish king did not follow the agreement and never participated in the crusade, but the Norwegian king performed the crusade in 1123. Contemporary Swedish sources do confirm warfare between pagans and Norwegian crusaders in the southeastern corner of Småland and on the island of Öland. The Norwegian crusader army reportedly successfully forced the inhabitants to submit to the Christian faith, and brought 1500 cattle and many valuables with them back to Norway.

References

12th-century crusades
12th century in Sweden
Northern Crusades
1123 in Europe
12th century in Norway
Medieval Sweden
Wars involving Norway
Wars involving Sweden
Military history of Norway
Military history of Sweden
Conflicts in 1123
Persecution of Pagans